Swivelhips is an album by saxophonist Willis Jackson which was recorded in 1968 and released on the Prestige label.

Reception

Allmusic awarded the album 3 stars.

Track listing 
All compositions by Willis Jackson except where noted.
 "Swivel Hips" – 6:51 
 "In a Mellow Tone" (Duke Ellington, Milt Gabler) – 8:45
 "Win, Lose or Draw" (Harold Ousley) – 3:54
 "Y'Understand Me? – 8:05 
 "By the Time I Get to Phoenix" (Jimmy Webb) – 6:00  
 "Florence of Arabia" (Howard Roberts) – 7:10

Personnel 
Willis Jackson – tenor saxophone, gator horn
Jackie Ivory – organ
Bill Jennings – guitar
Ben Tucker – bass, electric bass
Jerry Potter – drums
Ralph Dorsey – congas

References 

Willis Jackson (saxophonist) albums
1969 albums
Prestige Records albums
Albums recorded at Van Gelder Studio
Albums produced by Bob Porter (record producer)